Gottfried von Einem (24 January 1918 – 12 July 1996) was an Austrian composer. He is known chiefly for his operas influenced by the music of Stravinsky and Prokofiev, as well as by jazz. He also composed pieces for piano, violin and organ.

Biography

Einem was born in the Swiss capital Bern into an Austrian diplomat family. According to Einem's publisher, his father was William von Einem, military attaché of the Austro-Hungarian embassy. According to another source, however, he was adopted by Einem, his natural father being the Hungarian aristocrat Count László von Hunyadi. His mother, Baroness Gerta Louise née Rieß von Scheurnschloss, an officer's daughter from Kassel, led a lavish lifestyle between Berlin and Paris. The family moved to Malente in the Prussian Schleswig-Holstein Province, when Gottfried was four years old.

After his school days in Plön and Ratzeburg, Gottfried von Einem went to Berlin in 1937, to study at the State School of Music with Paul Hindemith who nevertheless resigned his post in October that year in protest against his modernist music being banned from public performances by Joseph Goebbels. By the agency of the tenor Max Lorenz, he started an employment as a répétiteur at the Berlin State Opera, where in 1939 Herbert von Karajan became Staatskapellmeister. From 1938 onwards, Einem also worked as an assistant of director Heinz Tietjen at the Bayreuth Festival. In 1941 he began to take counterpoint lessons with Boris Blacher; at that time he wrote his first work, Prinzessin Turandot, at the suggestion of Werner Egk. The ballet was first performed at the Dresden Semperoper conducted by Karl Elmendorff in early 1944 and became a success. Previously in March 1943, Leo Borchard had first performed Einem's composition Capriccio (Op. 2) with the Berlin Philharmonic orchestra.

During World War II, in Berlin, Einem helped to both save the life and continue the professional development of young Jewish musician  by employing him as a rehearsal assistant for Prinzessin Turandot and later helping him obtain other employment. Einem obtained a ration book and membership card of the Reich Musicians' Chamber for Latte, and lent him his own pass to the State Opera as well as introducing him to friends who could help his underground existence.

Through Blacher, Einem met his first wife, Lianne von Bismarck, whom he married after the war in 1946. They had a son, Caspar Einem, who was an Austrian cabinet minister. In 1953, the family moved back to Vienna. Lianne von Bismarck died in 1962. In 1966 Einem married his librettist, the renowned Austrian playwright and author Lotte Ingrisch. Apart from Vienna, the couple spent much of their time in the Waldviertel of Lower Austria (specifically, at Oberdürnbach and Rindlberg/Großpertholz), a virtually pristine region that clearly inspired not only his own work, but also the literature of Ingrisch.

The composer died in Oberdürnbach in 1996.

Works
Gottfried von Einem composed mainly operas based on dramas. He was internationally recognized after the premiere of his opera Dantons Tod at the Salzburg Festival of 1947, conducted by Ferenc Fricsay. His last operas, starting with Jesu Hochzeit, are based on libretti by his wife.

In 1973 he wrote as a commission of the UN to commemorate the 30th anniversary of its foundation the cantata An die Nachgeborenen for mezzo-soprano, baritone, chorus and orchestra, based on diverse texts. The title is taken  of Bertolt Brecht, translated as To Those Who Follow in Our Wake. The premiere in 1975 in New York with Julia Hamari, Dietrich Fischer-Dieskau, the Chorus of Temple University and the Wiener Symphoniker was conducted by Carlo Maria Giulini.

In England von Einem had two of his operas premiered within days of each other. In May 1973 The Trial (Der Prozeß) received its premiere at the Bloomsbury Theatre, London, conducted by Leon Lovett, directed by Fuad Kavur. The following week, at Glyndebourne The Visit of the Old Lady (Der Besuch der alten Dame) received its British premiere, conducted by John Pritchard and directed by John Cox.

In May 1996, the chamber chorus Cantori New York, directed by Mark Shapiro, gave the U.S. premiere of von Einem's cantata Die träumenden Knaben, for chorus, clarinet and bassoon, on a work by the painter Oskar Kokoschka.

Awards
 1955 Theodor Körner Prize
 1958:  (Prize of the City of Vienna for Music)
 1960 Associate Member of the Academy of Arts, West Berlin
 1965: Grand Austrian State Prize for Music (Großer Österreichischer Staatspreis für Musik)
 1974: Austrian Cross of Honour for Science and Art
 1975 Corresponding member of the Academy of Arts, East Berlin
 1979 Member of the Academy of Arts, West Berlin
 1993 Member of the Academy of Arts, Berlin
 2002: posthumously Righteous Among the Nations by Yad Vashem, for helping save the life of musician Konrad Latte

Selected operas
Dantons Tod (1947) after the play by Georg Büchner
Der Prozeß after the novel by Franz Kafka
Der Zerrissene after Johann Nestroy
Kabale und Liebe after the play by Friedrich Schiller
Der Besuch der alten Dame (1971) after the play by Friedrich Dürrenmatt
Jesu Hochzeit
Der Tulifant
Luzifers Lächeln

References

External links 
Homepage of the Gottfried von Einem Private Music Foundation (English version)
Gottfried von Einem – his activity to save Jews' lives during the Holocaust, at Yad Vashem website
, Gottfried von Einem: Munich Symphony, performed by the Sinfonieorchester des Norddeutschen Rundfunks conducted by Carlos Kalmar

1918 births
1996 deaths
20th-century classical composers
20th-century Austrian people
Austrian classical composers
Austrian opera composers
Male opera composers
Austrian Righteous Among the Nations
Austrian untitled nobility
Austrian expatriates in Switzerland
People from Bern
Recipients of the Austrian Cross of Honour for Science and Art
Recipients of the Grand Austrian State Prize
Members of the Academy of Arts, Berlin
Theodor Körner Prize recipients
Austrian male classical composers
20th-century male musicians
Austrian expatriates in Germany